Cathy Da Silva Sousa (born 27 September 1994) is a Luxembourger footballer who plays as a forward for Dames Ligue 1 club Bettembourg and formerly the Luxembourg women's national team.

International career
Da Silva Sousa made her senior debut for Luxembourg on 3 March 2018 during a 1–7 friendly loss to Morocco.

References

1994 births
Living people
Women's association football forwards
Luxembourgian women's footballers
Luxembourg women's international footballers
Luxembourgian people of Portuguese descent